Bear Canyon Lake is a lake built by Arizona Game and Fish Department for angler recreation. The facilities are maintained by Apache-Sitgreaves National Forest division of the USDA Forest Service.

Location
Bear Canyon Lake is located nearly an hour’s drive northeast of Payson, Arizona. Access is restricted in the winter when roads are closed due to snow, generally November to late April.

Description
The Department stocks it with catchable-sized rainbow trout about six times each year.

References

External links
 
 Arizona Fishing Locations Map
 Arizona Boating Locations Facilities Map
 Video of Bear Canyon Lake

Lakes of Arizona
Lakes of Coconino County, Arizona
Apache-Sitgreaves National Forests